Benthall may refer to:

 Benthall, Northumberland
 Benthall, Shropshire
 Benthall Hall located there
 Dwinelle Benthall (1890-1931), American screenwriter
 Michael Benthall (1919–1974), English theatre director
 William Benthall (1837–1909), English cricketer